Suresh (born as Naseem Ahmed; 13 November 1928 – 14 July 1979), also known as N. A. Suresh, was an Indian actor in Bollywood, who was born in Gurdaspur, Punjab, India. He acted in Hindi/Hindustani films from 1929 to 1979.

Early life
Suresh started as a child artiste in 1929 as baby Krishna in Gopal Krishna and as a child artiste in Nishan-e-Jung in 1937. His early films were Anjan (1941), Naya Sansar (1941) and Basant (1942).

Films as a hero
In the 1950s he was cast as a leading actor opposite the main heroines of those times, including Madhubala, Suraiya, Vyjayanthimala, and Geeta Bali. He was chosen as a hero by producer/director A. R. Kardar in many of his films, including Dulari (1949) opposite Madhubala, Jadoo (1951) opposite Nalini Jaywant, Deewana (1952) opposite Suraiya and Yasmin opposite Vyjanthimala. In Qaidi, Padmini was his heroine and in Teen Ustad (1961), he teamed up with Ameeta as his heroine. Shyama acted as the female lead opposite Suresh in Char Chand (1953). Suresh and Nigar Sultana were the leading pair of Rishta (1954) and Suresh and Usha Kiran acted as lead pair in Dost (1954). He produced movie Ganga Aur Suraj (1980), stars Sunil Dutt & Shashi Kapoor, released after his death.

For two years, Suresh went to Pakistan and acted in two films in 1950 and 1951, but then returned to India soon after.

Later films
After 1961, his popularity declined and he acted in supporting roles of films like Love Marriage, Mere Humsafar, Dillagi, Brahmachari, Parde Ke Peechay and many more.

He acted in over 55 films. He produced a film, Ganga aur Sooraj (1980), starring Sunil Dutt, Shashi Kapoor and Reena Roy, which over-ran its budget, because of the ill health of its original main villain, Anwar Hussain and rendered Suresh considerably weak financially. The film was released in 1980, after his death in 1979, aged 50.

He is most known for his role in Dulari (1949), especially in the song "Suhani Raat Dhal Chuki" by Mohammed Rafi.

Filmography

Sources:

References

External links
 
 

1928 births
1979 deaths
Indian male child actors
Indian male film actors
Place of birth missing